Riacho may refer to the following places in Brazil:

Dois Riachos, Alagoas
Riacho das Almas, Pernambuco
Riacho dos Cavalos, Paraíba
Riacho da Cruz, Rio Grande do Norte
Riacho Frio, Piauí
Riacho dos Machados, Minas Gerais
Riacho de Santana, Bahia
Riacho de Santana, Rio Grande do Norte
Riacho de Santo Antônio, Paraíba
Santana do Riacho, Minas Gerais

See also

Riachão (disambiguation)